The Persuaders are a New York City-based R&B vocal group best known for their gold hit single in the 1970s, "Thin Line Between Love and Hate". It sold over a million copies, topping the Billboard R&B chart, and was certified gold by the Recording Industry Association of America on October 29, 1971.

Career
The original members - Douglas "Smokey" Scott, Willie Holland, James Barnes, and Charles Stodghill - formed the group in New York in 1969 after previously singing with other local groups. Scott, Holland, and Barnes had been members of The Independents, whereas Stodghill had previously sung with the group The Topics. The Persuaders' sound involved close harmony, Scott's rough but emotive lead vocals and a heavily orchestrated soul and R&B approach, the trademark of the Poindexter brothers, Richard and Bobby, who produced most of the early 1970s hits through their Win Or Lose production company.

Early success
The Persuaders were signed by Atlantic Records in 1971 and scored an immediate hit with the iconic ode to domestic discord, "Thin Line Between Love and Hate," which topped the Black Singles chart and reached number 15 on the Pop chart.  An album titled after the song followed in 1972, scoring the group several more R&B chart hits, including another top ten, "Love's Gonna Pack Up (and Walk Out)".  The band toured throughout the year in support of the album. Following the conclusion of the tour, Barnes parted ways with the group. Tragically, later in 1972, Stodghill died of an illness at Jacobi Medical Center in the Bronx, soon after having narrowly escaped death during an argument in a bar where his former Topics bandmate Bobby Adams had died defending him.

By 1973, and the release of their self-titled second album, Thomas Lee Hill and John Tobias, both from another local group, The Huns, had replaced Barnes and Stodghill, respectively. Bobby Poindexter produced the second album with his wife, Jackie Members, who had also been a co-writer of the "Thin Line Between Love and Hate" single. By the end of the year, Scott was the only remaining original member, flanked by Hill, Joey Coleman, and Richard Gant. The group remained at Atlantic / Atco in this incarnation for another album, Best Thing That Ever Happened to Me, released in 1974. These Atco recordings were produced by Phil Hurtt, Tony Bell, and LeBaron Taylor in Philadelphia. The group scored a number of additional R&B and pop hits during this time, including their original version of the oft-covered song "Some Guys Have All the Luck", which inched into the Pop top 40 and became their final R&B top-ten single.

Later career
The group recorded an album on the Calla label (distributed by CBS Records) in 1976, again in Philadelphia but this time with producers Robert Curington and Norman Harris, entitled It's All About Love. One track, the ballad "I Need Love" was an R&B chart hit. They later released one single on Brunswick Records in 1981, with Douglas Scott still as lead singer.

As former members left and new members trickled in, the Persuaders' R&B legacy continued into the 21st century with two new line-ups of Persuaders. One group which tours as "The Persuaders" features Vincent Ballard, Sylvester Jones, Tmarvin Williams, and Keith Simmons.
The other group of Persuaders are currently touring as "The Persuaders Revue" featuring: Evan Wills, Chris White, Bernard Taylor and David Turner (the original lead singer of The Implements; David was the first to record the hit song "Look Over Your Shoulder"). The group now features: Greg Rowland, Lance Officer and Charles Saunders Jr.

There are no original members currently living. Following Stodghill's 1972 passing (described above), Douglas "Smokey" Scott passed away in 1994, while the timing of Barnes' death is unclear. Willie Holland, identified as the last living original member of the Persuaders, died on February 13, 2016.

Legacy
The Persuaders recorded the original soul versions of songs later covered by other artists, most notably "Some Guys Have All The Luck", covered by Robert Palmer, Rod Stewart and by Maxi Priest, and "Thin Line Between Love and Hate", covered by H-Town and later by the reggae group Black Slate and the British rock band the Pretenders. The song's title and theme were also used for the Martin Lawrence comedy film of the same name in 1996. In addition, the group was among a barrage of artists to first record the song "Best Thing that Ever Happened to Me". However, by the time the Persuaders' version appeared (from their 1974 album of the same name – William Coleman and Richard Gant are featured on this album), Gladys Knight & the Pips' version of the song was already on its way to becoming a major hit, massively overshadowing the Persuaders' rendition.

Discography

Studio albums

Compilation albums
The Platinum Collection (2007, Rhino/Warner Music)

Singles

References

External links

The Persuaders on Soulwalking.co.uk
"Thin Line Between Love and Hate" (video) by The Persuaders – YouTube
The Persuaders album reviews

American soul musical groups
Atlantic Records artists
Atco Records artists
Musical groups established in 1969
Musical groups from New York City